Plum Johnson is a Canadian writer and publisher, who won the RBC Taylor Prize in 2015 for her memoir They Left Us Everything.

Born in Richmond, Virginia, she spent her early childhood living in Asia until her parents moved to Oakville, Ontario. She studied education at Wheelock College in Boston and theatre at York University in Toronto.

In 1983, she established her own company, KidsCanada Publishing, to publish parenting publications such as the periodical Kids Toronto and children's and family service directories in both Toronto and Vancouver. In 2002, she launched Help's Here!, a similar resource publication for senior citizens and caregivers.

Johnson has also studied various art disciplines, including illustration, painting and printmaking. Her daughter Virginia is a noted Canadian textile artist.

References

External links

American emigrants to Canada
Canadian memoirists
Living people
21st-century Canadian non-fiction writers
21st-century Canadian women writers
Canadian magazine publishers (people)
Writers from Richmond, Virginia
Writers from Toronto
Wheelock College alumni
York University alumni
Canadian women memoirists
Year of birth missing (living people)
21st-century memoirists